Lake Lyokshmozero is a freshwater lake, located in the north-west of Kargopolsky District of Arkhangelsk Oblast in Russia. It is one of the biggest lakes in Arkhangelsk Oblast and the second biggest in Kargopolsky District (after Lake Lacha). Lake Lyokshmozero is the source of Lyokshma, a tributary of Lake Lacha. The lake thus belongs to the Onega basin and the White Sea basin.

The lake is located close to the border of Arkhangelsk Oblast and Republic of Karelia. It belongs to Kenozersky National Park.

The lake has an oval shape, elongated in the northg-west - south-east direction. The Lekshma flows out of the south-eastern corner and flows south-east. There are four villages at the shores of the lake, Morshchikhinskaya, Kazarinovskaya, Ileksinskaya, and Khvalinskaya. The two latter villages are located on the unpaved road connecting Kargopol and Pudozh.

The lake has a glacial origin.

References

Lyokshmozero
LLyokshmozero